McCrae's Battalion was the affectionate name given by the people of Edinburgh to the 16th (Service) Battalion of the Royal Scots in World War I, raised from volunteers in 1914 as part of the New Armies called to the Colours by Lord Kitchener. The unit was named after its charismatic colonel, former Liberal MP for Edinburgh East, Sir George McCrae.

Background
Largely composed of professional and amateur sportsmen, "McCrae's" was the first of the so-called 'footballers' Pals battalions to be raised during the war and was the main inspiration behind the creation of the 17th Battalion, Middlesex Regiment in 1915.

16 players from Heart of Midlothian F.C. ("Hearts") enlisted, along with 500 supporters and ticket-holders. Hearts were leading the Scottish League at the time the battalion was raised in November 1914. In addition to the Hearts contingent, players and 150 followers of Hibernian, seven Raith Rovers players and a number of professional footballers from Falkirk, Dunfermline Athletic, East Fife and St Bernard's also enlisted. Fans were encouraged to follow in their heroes' footsteps and fight alongside the men they cheered on every Saturday afternoon. Rugby players, athletes and a variety of other sportsmen also joined the battalion.

The contemporary Hearts manager John McCartney authored two booklets documenting Scottish footballers in the Great War and those from Hearts who perished.

The unit was named after its charismatic colonel, Sir George McCrae, a former Liberal MP for Edinburgh East. It was the subject of a detailed historical account published in 2003 by Jack Alexander. Shortly after the publication of this book, a memorial cairn was constructed in the village of Contalmaison on the Somme. Designed by Alexander, the McCrae's Battalion Great War Memorial cairn now attracts hundreds of visitors every year to the village.

In October 2014, the battalion was inducted to the Scottish Football Hall of Fame.

Gallery

Battalion members

Footballers

Other sportsmen

Notes

See also 

Football Battalion
Heart of Midlothian F.C. and World War I

References

External links 
 McCrae’s Battalion Trust
 Royal Scots article on the induction into the Scottish Football Hall of Fame
 Hearts of courage – The legendary McCrae’s Own (Royal British Legion)
Scottish Football Hall of Fame profile

 
1914 establishments in Scotland
Heart of Midlothian F.C.
Raith Rovers F.C.
Falkirk F.C.
Dunfermline Athletic F.C.
Hibernian F.C.
Royal Scots
Military history of Scotland
History of Edinburgh
History of football in Scotland
Scottish Football Hall of Fame inductees
Military units and formations established in 1914
Military units and formations in Edinburgh